The 2021–22 West Virginia Mountaineers women's basketball team represented West Virginia University during the 2021–22 NCAA Division I women's basketball season. The Mountaineers were coached by twenty first-year head coach Mike Carey, played their home games at WVU Coliseum and were members of the Big 12 Conference.

They finished the season 15–15 overall and, 7–11 in Big 12 play to finish in seventh place.  As the seventh seed in the Big 12 Tournament, they defeated TCU in the First Round before losing to Iowa State in the Second Round.  They were not invited to the NCAA tournament or the WNIT.

Previous season
The Mountaineers finished the season 22–7, 13–5 in Big 12 play to finish in a tie for second place.  As the second seed in the Big 12 Tournament, they defeated Kansas State and Oklahoma State before losing to Baylor in the Final.  They received an at-large bid to the NCAA tournament.  As the four seed in the HemisFair Regional they defeated  before losing to Georgia Tech in the Second Round to end their season.

Roster

Schedule
Source:

|-
!colspan=6 style=| Exhibition

|-
!colspan=6 style=| Non-Conference Regular season

|-
!colspan=6 style=| Big 12 Regular season

|-
!colspan=6 style=| Big 12 Women's Tournament

Rankings

References

West Virginia Mountaineers women's basketball
West Virginia
West Virginia Mountaineers women's basketball
West Virginia Mountaineers women's basketball